Peter Easton (born 21 October 1936) is an Australian cricketer. He played in one first-class match for Queensland in 1959/60.

See also
 List of Queensland first-class cricketers

References

External links
 

1936 births
Living people
Australian cricketers
Queensland cricketers
Cricketers from Brisbane